Parliamentary elections were held in Finland on 1 and 2 October 1930. The Social Democratic Party emerged as the largest in Parliament with 66 of the 200 seats. Voter turnout was 65.9%.

Background
The 1930 elections were conducted in a politically heated atmosphere.  The far-right Lapua Movement, which had been organized in November 1929, pressured the government to outlaw the Communist Party and its cover organizations, such as the Workers' and Small Farmers' Electoral Associations, as treasonous organizations.  Prime Minister Kallio tried to persuade the Parliament to outlaw the Communists' political activity in June 1930, but the proposed constitutional amendment did not gain the five-sixths majority required for an immediate amendment of the Constitution.  Thus the constitutional changes would have to be ratified by the next Parliament.  Kallio resigned, partly pressured to do so by President Relander. In July 1930, Relander appointed as the new Prime Minister Mr. P.E. Svinhufvud (National Coalition), a former Prime Minister and Regent.  His government sought to persuade the Finnish voters to elect a Parliament where the right-wing and centrist parties would have a two-thirds majority, which was - and is - needed to ratify changes to the Finnish Constitution.  As a part of their strategy, they authorized the Investigative Central Police to deprive about 20,000 suspected Communists of the right to vote.  The Lapua Movement kidnapped, took by car to isolated places and physically assaulted various left-wing politicians.

Results

Aftermath
The right-wing and centrist parties received exactly two-thirds of the seats, and thus the new Parliament ratified the constitutional amendments which outlawed the Communist Party and its affiliated organizations until 1944.

References

General elections in Finland
Finland
Parliament
Finland
Election and referendum articles with incomplete results